The Halifax Citadels were a professional ice hockey team based in Halifax, Nova Scotia. They played in the American Hockey League between 1988 and 1993. They were created by the relocation of the Fredericton Express and filled a void left by the relocation of the Nova Scotia Oilers to Cape Breton.

The Citadels, named after the Halifax Citadel military fort, were affiliated with the Quebec Nordiques National Hockey League team. Home games were played at the Halifax Metro Centre, located at the base of Citadel Hill.

The franchise was moved to Cornwall, Ontario in 1993, where they were known as the Cornwall Aces.  One year later, the Halifax Mooseheads of the QMJHL filled the void in the market.

On August 26, 2021, the Halifax Mooseheads announced on their 2021-22 promotional schedule that on November 27, 2021, they would be wearing Halifax Citadels throwback jerseys in their game against the Blainville-Boisbriand Armada for "90's Night".

Season-by-season results

Regular season

Playoffs

Career leaders

Goals: 121 (Mark Vermette, 1988–93)

Assists: 110 (Mark Vermette, 1988–93)

Points: 231 (Mark Vermette, 1988–93)

PIM: 920 (Greg Smyth, 1988–92)

See also
List of ice hockey teams in Nova Scotia
Sports teams in Halifax, Nova Scotia

References

 
Sport in Halifax, Nova Scotia
Ice hockey clubs established in 1988
Sports clubs disestablished in 1993
1988 establishments in Nova Scotia
1993 disestablishments in Nova Scotia
Quebec Nordiques minor league affiliates